Krasna  (Krasna) is a village in the administrative district of Gmina Korczyna, within Krosno County, Subcarpathian Voivodeship, in south-eastern Poland.

References

Villages in Krosno County